Arlene Zallman (9 September 193425 November 2006) was an American composer and music educator.

Life

Zallman was born in Philadelphia and graduated from the Juilliard School of Music. She received a master's degree from the University of Pennsylvania, where she studied composition with Vincent Persichetti and George Crumb. In 1959 she received a two-year Fulbright Scholarship to Florence, Italy, to study with Luigi Dallapiccola. She held positions on the faculty of the Oberlin College Conservatory of Music and Yale University and then became a professor of composition at Wellesley, Massachusetts in 1976.

She received the Marion S. Freschl Award for Vocal Composition, and awards from Meet the Composer, the Mellon Foundation, the Massachusetts Council for the Arts and Humanities, and the Guggenheim Foundation. Her Three Songs from Quasimodo won awards from both the National Endowment for the Arts and the International Society for Contemporary Music.

She held fellowships at the MacDowell Colony, where she received the Faye Barnaby Kent Fellow. During 2001-2, she was a Fellow at the Radcliffe Institute for Advanced Study. In 2003 Zallman was a guest composer-in-residence at the Rocca di Mezzo Music Festival in the Abruzzi region of Italy.

Zallman has two daughters. She died in her home in Wellesley in 2006 and was buried in Amherst, Massachusetts.

Works
Zallman completed a number of compositions on commission, including The Trio in 1999. Her works are published by the Association for the Promotion of New Music and by C.F. Peters.

Selected works include:

A Whimsical Offering piano solo 7 min 1994
Analogy for solo flute 5 min 1971
And with Ah! Bright Wings (G. M. Hopkins) chorus (SATB) and organ 8 min 1986
Emerson Motets for chorus (SATB) 12 min 1985
Letters (Dickinson) for mezzo-soprano and viola 5 min 1996
Luoghi (Places) tenor 14 min 1998
Nightsongs I for violin and piano 4 min 1984
Racconto for piano 8 min 1968
Shakespeare Sonnet CXXVIII (How oft, when thou my music) for baritone and piano 4 min 1980
Shakespeare Sonnet XVIII (Shall I compare thee) for soprano and piano 3 min 1958
Shakespeare Sonnets XXXIII (Full many a morning) & XL (Take all my loves) baritone, 7 min 1979
Soliloquium solo violoncello 5 min 1986
Sonnet/Sonata (Shakespeare CII My love is strengthened) for soprano and piano 7 min 1991
The Cigarette Butt Blues (Pavese: Il blues delle cicche) for women’s voices, 7 min 1991
Three Preludes piano solo 5 min 1979
Three Songs from Quasimodo (Three Italian Songs) soprano, 6 min 1976
To a Hurdy-Gurdy (Corrazzini: Per organo di barberia) for soprano and violoncello 4 min 1975
Vox Faminae (Carmina burana) Song cycle for soprano and piano 23 min 2002

References

1934 births
2006 deaths
20th-century classical composers
American women classical pianists
American classical pianists
American women classical composers
American classical composers
American music educators
American women music educators
Jewish American classical composers
20th-century classical pianists
20th-century American women pianists
20th-century American pianists
20th-century American composers
20th-century women composers
20th-century American Jews
21st-century American Jews
21st-century American women